The flower-faced bat (Anthops ornatus) is a species of bat in the family Hipposideridae. It is in the monotypic genus Anthops. It is found in the Autonomous Region of Bougainville of Papua New Guinea and in the Solomon Islands. This rare and little-known bat has been recorded from tropical moist forest and flying around village houses.

References

Hipposideridae
Bats of Oceania
Endemic fauna of the Solomon Islands
Mammals of Papua New Guinea
Mammals of the Solomon Islands
Bougouriba Province
Mammals described in 1888
Taxonomy articles created by Polbot
Taxa named by Oldfield Thomas